Walk Through Walls is the fifth studio album by the American singer-songwriter Katie Herzig. The album was recorded at her own St. Cecelia Studios in Nashville together with Cason Cooley. The album was mixed by Justin Gerrish and was self-released.

Track listing

References 

2014 albums
Katie Herzig albums